Coutts River is a stream in Alberta, Canada.

Coutts River has the name of G. M. Coutts, a government surveyor.

See also
List of rivers of Alberta

References

Rivers of Alberta